Zoila is a genus of sea snails, marine gastropod molluscs in the family Cypraeidae, the cowries.

Species
Species within the genus Zoila include:
 Zoila alabaster Mont & Lorenz, 2013
 † Zoila campestris Darragh, 2011 
 † Zoila chathamensis (Cernohorsky, 1971) 
 Zoila decipiens (E.A. Smith, 1880)
 † Zoila didymorhyncha Darragh, 2011 
 † Zoila dolichorhyncha Darragh, 2011 
 Zoila eludens L. Raybaudi, 1991
 † Zoila fodinata Darragh, 2011 
 Zoila friendii (J. E. Gray, 1831)
 † Zoila gigas (McCoy, 1867) 
 † Zoila glomerabilis Darragh, 2011 
 Zoila jeaniana Cate, 1968
 Zoila ketyana (L. Raybaudi, 1978)
 Zoila marginata (Gaskoin, 1849)
 Zoila mariellae L. Raybaudi, 1983
 † Zoila mulderi (Tate, 1892) 
 Zoila orientalis Raybaudi, 1985
 Zoila perlae Lopez & Chiang, 1975
 † Zoila platypyga (McCoy, 1876) 
 Zoila raywalkeri Lorenz, 2011
 Zoila rosselli Cotton, 1948
 Zoila thersites (Gaskoin, 1849)
 Zoila venusta (G.B. Sowerby I, 1847)
 † Zoila viathomsoni Darragh, 2011 
Species brought into synonymy
 Zoila atrata Sulliotti, G.R., 1924: synonym of Mangelia decipiens E.A. Smith, 1888
 † Zoila caputavisensis Beets, 1987 : synonym of † Afrozoila caputavisensis (Beets, 1987)
 Zoila delicatura Chandler & DuRoss, 1997: synonym of Zoila eludens delicatura Chandler & DuRoss, 1997
 Zoila episema Iredale, 1939: synonym of Zoila venusta episema Iredale, 1939
 † Zoila kendengensis F. A. Schilder, 1941 : synonym of † Afrozoila kendengensis (F. A. Schilder, 1941)
 † Zoila schilderi Dey, 1941 : synonym of  † Afrozoila schilderi (Dey, 1941)

References

 Jousseaume F. (1884). Division des Cypraeidae. Le Naturaliste. 6(52): 414-415. page(s): 414

External links

Cypraeidae
Gastropod genera
Prehistoric gastropod genera
Gastropods described in 1884
Taxa named by Félix Pierre Jousseaume